Khooni Darinda is a Hindi horror film of Bollywood directed and produced by Dhirubhai Daxini. This film was released in 1987. Lead singers of the film are Mohammed Rafi and Lata Mangeshkar.

Plot

Cast
 Abhi Bhattacharya
 Jayshree Gadkar
 Mohan Choti
 Shaheeda Khan
 Nazima
 Master Bhagwan
 Shaminder Singh
 Smita Modi
 Santosh Bala
 Minu Khanna
 Rani Bangali

Music
Ratandeep–Hemraj composed the songs whereas Agha Sarwar wrote them.

"Aayega Koi Mere Paas" - Asha Bhosle 
"Jaa Raha Hai Pyaar Mera" - Krishna Kalle
"Chanda Ko Chakor Karke" - N/A
"Jaan-e-Jigar Dekh Idhar" - Mohammed Rafi, Manna Dey, Suman Kalyanpur 
"Mehfil Bhi Hai, Deewane Bhi" - Mohammed Rafi

References

External links
 

1987 films
1980s Hindi-language films
Indian horror films
1987 horror films
Hindi-language horror films